

References

Lists of sports events
Lists of events in North Macedonia
Lists of events by venue